The Embassy of the State of Palestine in Kuwait is the diplomatic mission of the Palestine in Kuwait. It is located in Bayan area in Hawalli.

Embassy of the State of Palestine in Kuwait re-opened in 2013, and Rami Tahboub considered the first Palestinian ambassador of in Kuwait after Invasion of Kuwait in 1990, when Palestine Liberation Organization accused of supporting Saddam Hussein.

See also

List of diplomatic missions in Kuwait.
List of diplomatic missions of Palestine.

References

Diplomatic missions of the State of Palestine
Diplomatic missions in Kuwait
Kuwait–State of Palestine relations